The Borucice Formation, also known in older literature as the Borucice Series, is a Jurassic (Middle-Late Toarcian) geologic formation that extends to nearly whole of Poland. This formation represents the last sequence of the lower Jurassic in Poland, recovering the depositional sequences IX and X, and may even recover lowermost parts of the first Middle Jurassic sequence. It represents mostly a series of alluvial (braided or meandering channel) depositional systems with subordinate intervals of deltaic deposits. Dinosaur Tracks are among the fossils that have been recovered from the formation. Most of the sediments of the Polish realm come from deltaic, fluvial and marine deposits. It mainly consists of light whitish-grey, fine grained sandstones interbedded by clay containing plant detritus and minute fragments of coal. It also has darkgrey mudstones with marine lamellibranches and an Upper Lias microfauna. Its main equivalents are the Jurensismergel Formation of Germany, upper part of the Rya Formation (Southern Sweden)and the uppermost Sorthat Formation (Bornholm). There are also coeval abandoned informal units in Poland: Upper Lisiec beds (Czêstochowa region), or the Kamień Beds (Pomerania region).



Sedimentological evolution
On the Częstochowa region the sequences IX and X are developed mostly as alluvial, meandering river deposits with subordinate lacustrine lithofacies. The Deltaic deposits are found on the Suliszowice 38 BN Borehole and the arki 89 ¯ borehole, and show how these delta deposits were preceded by a short-lived brackish-marine ingression associated with lagoonal mudstones and heteroliths. The mudstone layers show high boron, along with the presence of pyrite concretions and more abundant Fodinichnia. The local delta episode is reported from the depositional sequence IX, while the sequence X is developed as alluvial deposits (sandstones with trough cross bedding and rich plant fossils) with some intercalations of lacustrine deposits.

On the Pomerania region the formation starts with a depositional sequence IX that begins with a common erosional surface seen on the Mechowo IG 1 borehole exposed by medium-to-fine-grained sandstones with trough cross bedding and horizontal bedding, that come from a series of from alluvial channels to distributary channels on depositional subsystems. It is overlayed by sediments composed by mudstone and heterolithic lithofacies that point to a rise in the level of the local water, but unclear if derived from a sea ingression or from alluvial floodplain deposits, delta plain deposits or, delta-front deposits. There are present coarsening-upwards cycles as well as slightly elevated boron content, which point to the dominated deposition of a delta. The Depositional sequence X is composed mostly of a thin sedimentary package of coarse alluvial sediments resting on the erosional surface and topped with a thin mudstone bed with the Paxillitriletes phyllicus spore.

Stratygraphic profile
The profiles recovered between Aleksandrów Kujawski and Rogoźno on the Kuyavian-Pomeranian Voivodeship the Borucice Formation is known as the top of the sandstone series. There level is composed mostly by an admixture of coarse grain sandstone, which mark the beginning of a new sedimentary cycle. It has inserts of clayey Clay loupes present as a subordinate role. Is disposed along the Krogniewice series, composed of sandstones, in its main mass probably containing only thin and rarely broken clay inserts, while in the uppermost part there is abundant inserts. This part of the highest level is the equivalent of multiple phases of levels VI A and VI B in the vicinity of Kiodawa. Apparently, there is a lack of VI C level flashers in Krogniewice, which are eroded before the Aalenian level. Locally, the border section Middle/Lower Jurassic wasn't worked and the location of it wasn't completely solved. The Borucice Formation has a thickness here of 100–150 m. Overlaying the formation, is covered with transgression Aalenian sea sediments, where the transition, if exists, is gradual and small.

Annelida

Actinopteri

Theropoda

Palynology
The Polish Toarcian Palynology is assigned to the Paxillitriletes phyllicus (Ph) level (Isoetales), due to the abundance of this genus. The lower part of the Toarcian level is even marked by the numerous occurrences of this species, sometimes also slightly precede the appearance of the genera Erlansonisporites sparassis (Selaginella-like) and Minerisporites volucris (Isoetaceae), as shown on the Gorzów Wlkp. IG 1 Borehole. While the uppermost part is marked by a notorious decrease on the genus. The most common species found on Poland in this interval include: Erlansonisporites sparassis, E. excavatus, Minerisporites volucris and Biharisporites scaber (Lycopodiopsida), with Aneuletes potera (Selaginellaceae) and Trileites murrayi (Selaginellaceae) on the upper levels. The Toarcian disturbance of the carbon cycle, recorded on the Ciechocinek formation, coincides roughly with the appearance of Paxillitriletes phyllicus, that comes also with a clear change on the type of dominant palynomorphs recovered, changing from the predominance of pollen grains in the Upper Pliensbachian to Megaespores, what indicates a rather significant climate change, from moderate and relatively dry in late Pliensbachian to warm and humid in the early Toarcian. This shift on the local climate does correlate temporarily with a global maritime transgression, which allows the exact stratigraphic-sequential correlation of this event, where the initial volcanism in the volcanic province Karoo-Ferrar rise the global temperature and generating rapid abnormalities in the carbon cycle, manifested in the form of the super-greenhouse effect in the atmospheric system. Moreover, the mass occurrence of megaspore Paxillitriletes phyllicus correlate with the mentioned pulses and thus with extremely repetitive episodes hot and humid (greenhouse) climate, as the flora appears to be dominated by the family Isoetaceae, extremely hydrophilic, needing standing water to reproduction.

The Borucice Formation is where Paxillitriletes phyllicus drops significantly, which indicates a return to a more moderate climate during sedimentation, corresponding to the post-variabilis age, and related with drier conditions of the Middle Toarcian, as recovered in places such as the Raasay Ironstone Formation of the Inner Hebrides. It is measured also on the Lusitanian Basin or on Yorkshire. The Changes on the flora are also correlated with the more fluvial sedimentation of the Formation.

Plant Remains
The local material comes from the plant-rich, Floodplain Claystones of the Borucice Formation (on the Ciechocinek IG 1 borehole). The formation is composed mostly of fluvial sandstones, less frequently of fine-grained deposits, mostly channel fill deposits in the lower part, and crevasse splay and floodplain deposits in the upper part.

Economical resources
Different options of hydrogen reservoirs underground storage were studied at the Łeba Elevation, Fore-Sudetic Monocline, Carpathian Foredeep, and salt stocks in the Polish Lowlands. The Borucice Formation covered in turn by Middle Jurassic fine-grained clastics especially of Aalenian and Bajocian age. The open porosity commonly ranges from 15% to 20% and pore water salinity reaches 200 g/L.

 storage of this formation has been view on several locations, such as the Kamionki Anticline. The measured best conditions for geologic  storage are displayed on the Borucice Beds and Lower Aalenian sandstones (Upper Sławęcin Beds) occurring below the Upper Aalenian clay-mud cap.
On the Zaosie Anticline various aquifers for  storage were reviewed, including two Lower Jurassic ones: Borucice Formation and the Pliensbachian Komorowo Formation The Borucice storage was tested in the boreholes of Zaosie 1 (at 500.0–665.0 m), Zaosie 2 (at 518.0–686.0 m), Zaosie 3 (at 537.0–680.0 m) and Budziszewice IG-1 (at 649.0–850.0 m), showing good reservoir properties (in terms of geological structure, thickness, lithology and physico-chemical characteristics) and is probably infiltrated by surface waters. The volumetric  storage capacity was calculated on approximately 222 million tons. But due to the small depth of the aquifer, the Borucice Formation did not meet the requirements for a major  storage.

Gostynin region has shown favourable geothermal conditions Lower-Middle Jurassic formations, with the Gostynin IG-1/1a Borehole (at 2290–2245 m depth) used for preliminary evaluation of balneological properties and thermodynamical status of these waters. The Borucice Formation (at 2702.6 – 2661.8 m; 2615–2605; 2310 – 2096.4 m), the occurrence of brines with Total Dissolved Solids from 99.4 to 110.0 g/dm3 was confirmed, characterized by low alteration of its chemical composition.

See also
List of fossiliferous stratigraphic units in Poland
Jurensismergel Formation, Germany
Ziliujing Formation, China
Yanan Formation, China

References

Geologic formations of Poland
Jurassic System of Europe
Lower Jurassic Series
Middle Jurassic Series
Sandstone formations
Mudstone formations
Coal formations
Fluvial deposits
Lacustrine deposits